RUN and FYVE domain-containing protein 1 is a protein that in humans is encoded by the RUFY1 gene. It is named after the RUN and FYVE domains it contains.

Interactions 

RUFY1 has been shown to interact with BMX.

References

Further reading